Thornberry may refer to:

People

 Robert Desmond Thornberry (1907–1969), Canadian politician 
 Homer Thornberry (1909–1995), Texas politician (10th congressional district) and judge
 David Thornberry (1911–1995), bishop of Wyoming, United States
 Cedric Thornberry (1936–2014), Assistant-Secretary-General of the United Nations
 Mac Thornberry (born 1958), Texas politician (13th congressional district)
 Emily Thornberry (born 1960), British politician
 Michael Thornberry (born 1972), American handball player
 Nancy Thornberry, American chemist
 Jason Thornberry, American musician
 Terence Thornberry, American criminologist

Other
 Thornberry, Texas, an unincorporated community
 Thornberry Animal Sanctuary, Yorkshire, England

See also
 Thornbury (disambiguation)